The Loobu is a river in Northern Estonia. Its source is about 12 km southwest from Rakvere in Lääne-Viru County and it drains into Eru Bay (part of Finnish Gulf) near the village of Vihasoo in Lahemaa National Park.

Its drainage basin is rather small and narrow, Loobu lacks any major tributaries.

At Joaveski, 10 km upstream from its mouth, the Loobu flows over the Baltic Klint, forming the Joaveski Waterfall.

Kadrina (population: 2,600) is the only significant settlement on the river.

Gallery

References
 

Rivers of Estonia
Landforms of Lääne-Viru County